The Boy and Bird Fountain by Bashka Paeff is installed in Boston's Public Garden, in the U.S. state of Massachusetts. The original fountain was cast in 1934, then later recast in 1977 and 1992. It features a bronze sculpture of a nude boy holding a bird, resting on a granite base. The work was surveyed as part of the Smithsonian Institution's "Save Outdoor Sculpture!" program in 1993.

References

External links

 

1934 establishments in Massachusetts
1934 sculptures
Boston Public Garden
Bronze sculptures in Massachusetts
Fountains in Massachusetts
Nude sculptures in the United States
Outdoor sculptures in Boston
Sculptures of birds in the United States
Sculptures of children in the United States
Statues in Boston